Leonard Warren Borisoff (June 12, 1942 – November 5, 2020), known professionally as Len Barry, was an American singer, songwriter, lyricist, record producer, author, and poet.

Life and career
Born on June 12, 1942 and raised in Philadelphia, Barry had little thought of a show business career while still in school. Instead, he aspired to become a professional basketball player upon his graduation. It was not until he entered military service and had occasion to sing with the US Coast Guard band at Cape May, New Jersey, and was so encouraged by the response of his military audiences, that he decided to make music a career.

Upon his discharge from military service, Barry returned home to Philadelphia and formed the Dovells.  Barry was the lead singer, appearing on all of the group's best selling records, such as "Bristol Stomp", "Hully Gully Baby", and "You Can't Sit Down", among others.  "Bristol Stomp" sold over one million copies and was awarded a RIAA gold disc. As a Dovell, he also toured with James Brown.  Barry also made film appearances with the Dovells in films such as Don't Knock the Twist, toured the UK with the Motown Revue. Barry also had guest appearances on US television on Bandstand and later American Bandstand, Shindig, and Hullabaloo. Soon after leaving the group, Barry recorded his first solo single "Lip Sync".

As someone who sang rhythm and blues, he recorded hits in 1965 and 1966 for Decca Records in the US and released by Brunswick Records: "1-2-3", "Like a Baby", and "I Struck It Rich", a song he wrote with Leon Huff of the Philadelphia International Records producers, Gamble and Huff.

His first two hits also made the Top Ten of the UK Singles Chart. "1-2-3" reached number three. Those songs also peaked at number 2 and 27 on the US Billboard Hot 100 chart respectively. "1-2-3" sold over four million copies, and gave Barry his second RIAA gold disc and a Grammy Award nomination for Contemporary Rock & Roll Male Vocal Performance. Both "1-2-3" and "Like a Baby" were composed by Barry, John Madara, and David White.

He performed at the Apollo Theatre in New York; the Howard Theatre in Washington, D.C.; The Regal Chicago, Chicago; Illinois; The Fox Theatre (Detroit) in Detroit, Michigan; and The Uptown (Philadelphia), Philadelphia, Pennsylvania. He also toured with Sam Cooke, The Motown Revue in the United Kingdom, and appeared on Top of the Pops.

He became a major singing star in The United Kingdom. Highlights of his European tour included featured performances at the London Palladium and Royal Albert Hall as well as numerous appearances throughout England, Ireland, Scotland and Wales.

Barry's respect for the Native American culture led him to write and produce the instrumental "Keem-O-Sabe". The song went to number 16 on the Billboard Hot 100 in 1969 for The Electric Indian.

He also did writing and production work with WMOT Productions. With Bobby Eli he helped write the hit singles "Zoom" for Fat Larry's Band and "Love Town" for Booker Newberry III.

In May 2008, Barry reinvented himself as an author with the publication of the novel, Black-Like-Me. The storyline involved a pair of Caucasian siblings growing up in a largely African-American neighborhood, accepted by some, rejected by others.

In 2011, Barry was featured in the PBS Series My Music: Rock, Pop & Doo Wop.

Len Barry died on November 5, 2020, at Nazareth Hospital in Philadelphia.  The cause was myelodysplasia, or cancer of the bone marrow.

Discography

Albums
 1-2-3 (1965) - Decca Records
 My Kind of Soul (1967) - RCA Records
 Ups and Downs (1972) - Buddah Records
 More from the 123 Man (1982) - Bulldog

Singles

As lead singer with The Dovells
 (see separate Wikipedia entry for The Dovells for full discography)

Solo singles discography

See also

List of artists under the Decca Records label
List of people from Philadelphia
List of NME covers
List of performers on Top of the Pops

References

External links

Billboard: Len Barry Chart History
Entry at 45cat.com
Oldies.com biography
BIG V JAMBOREE site                    
Grammy Awards 1966
Len Barry's 'Prose & Cons: Advice From a Music Legend Who's Seen It All: Question Everything'
Facebook: The Official Len Barry Page
 YouTube: 'The Len Barry Story' (documentary - full movie)

1942 births
2020 deaths
American male singers
Jewish American songwriters
Jewish singers
Military personnel from Philadelphia
Musicians from Philadelphia
Decca Records artists
Songwriters from Pennsylvania
Singers from Pennsylvania
American rhythm and blues singers
21st-century American Jews
American male songwriters